Thomas Roth may refer to:

 Thomas Roth (journalist) (born 1951), German news anchor presenter
 Thomas Roth (musician) (born 1951), Brazilian singer, composer and TV presenter on Sistema Brasileiro de Televisão
 Thomas Roth (athlete) (born 1991), Norwegian middle-distance runner